Vellaiya Irukiravan Poi Solla Maatan is a 2015 Tamil language comedy film written and directed by newcomer A. L. Abanindran. The film features an ensemble cast of Praveen Kumar, Sanam Shetty, Shalini Vadnikatti, Bala Saravanan, Aruldoss, Jayaprakash, Karthik Kumar, and Aadukalam Naren. The film released on 24 December 2015.

Cast 

 Praveen Kumar as Karthik
 Sanam Shetty as Aruna
 Shalini Vadnikatti as Pooja
 Bala Saravanan as Mani
 Aruldoss as Rajagopal
 Jayaprakash as Ramalingam, Karthik's father
 Karthik Kumar as Dr. Raghu
 Aadukalam Naren as Periyavar
 Five Star Krishna as Varma
 T. M. Karthik as Sharma
 K. S. G. Venkatesh as Lawyer Krishna Moorthy
 Gnanavel as Shanmugam
 Supergood Subramani as Selvarathnam
 M. J. Shriram as Pradeep Kumar IAS
 Poo Ram as Pandian
 Pazhani as Thiruvengadam
 Raja Rishi as Subbaiah
 Aroul D. Shankar as Prakash
 Ilankainathan as Gnanam

Production 
The project was announced by Devanshu Arya of Ignite Films and director Abanindran in late 2014, and marked the director's feature film debut after he and Devanshu Arya had previously assisted during the making of Rajiv Menon's Minsara Kanavu (1997) and Kandukondain Kandukondain (2000). The film stars newcomer Praveen Kumar, who played a supporting role in Kalyana Samayal Saadham (2013) in the lead role alongside Shalini Vadnikatti, a model from Hyderabad. Abanindran had worked with Praveen Kumar and the producers, Ignite Films, before, when the trio worked on the television serial, Dharmayutham for Vijay TV during 2012. Cinematographer Ravi Varman also worked as a co-producer for the film, marking his maiden production. The ensemble cast was also revealed to feature Sanam Shetty, Karthik Kumar, Aadukalam Naren, Jayaprakash and Bala Saravanan, while Anthony was announced as the film's editor. The film was named after a dialogue spoken by Vadivelu in the film Aarya (2007).

The team shot the film around Chennai in forty days. After the film was completed, S. Thanu of Kalaipuli International bought the film's worldwide distribution rights.

Soundtrack 
Soundtrack was composed by Joshua Sridhar.
"Gappu La Aappu" - Santhosh Hariharan
"Nizhala Nijama" - Saicharan

Release 
The film released to mixed reviews in December 2015, having been delayed for three weeks as a result of the 2015 South Indian floods. A critic from The New Indian Express noted that "it was an impressive debut". Times of India wrote "There is a wonderful screwball vibe to Vellaiya Irukiravan Poi Solla Maatan (VIPSM), a black comedy that is a confident debut by Abanindran. The director manages to keep things relatable and even when things get out of hand for the hapless protagonist, they do not feel improbable."

References

External links 

Official Website
Facebook Page Official Facebook

2015 films
2010s Tamil-language films
Indian black comedy films
2015 directorial debut films
Films scored by Joshua Sridhar